Milnesville is an unincorporated community located in Hazle Township in Luzerne County, Pennsylvania. Milnesville is located along Pennsylvania Route 309,  a short distance south of the Airport Beltway intersection to the north of Hazleton.

References

Unincorporated communities in Luzerne County, Pennsylvania
Unincorporated communities in Pennsylvania